Nihoul is a surname. Notable people with the surname include:

Jacques Nihoul (1937–2021), Belgian scientist and professor
Michel Nihoul (1941–2019), Belgian businessman and radio host